Probabeel (foaled 6 November 2016) is a multiple Group 1 winning New Zealand bred thoroughbred racehorse.

Background

Probabeel was born and bred at Waikato Stud in Matamata, New Zealand.  Initially the stud intended to keep her for racing, however she was sold.

Probabeel was purchased by Brendan and Jo Lindsay who own Cambridge Stud for NZ$380,000.

Racing career

Probabeel became the first horse in history to complete the Karaka Million 2YO and Karaka Million 3YO double. She was ridden in both wins by Opie Bosson.

After completing this double she was successful on 29 February 2020 when ridden again by Opie Bosson in the Group 1 Surround Stakes (1400m) at Randwick Racecourse. She beat Funstar and Xilong.

Probabeel would next achieve victory as a 4-year-old in both the Bill Ritchie Handicap at Randwick and the Epsom Handicap, on both occasions ridden by Kerrin McEvoy.

On 6 February 2021 Probabeel won the group 3 Lamaro's Sth Melbourne Geoffrey Bellmaine Stakes, carrying 60kg over 1200m with Damian Lane aboard, easily beating Paul's Regret and Snapdancer.

On 20 February 2021, Probabeel achieved her third Group 1 victory when successful in the Futurity Stakes (1400m) at Caulfield, ridden by Damian Lane and beating Arcadia Queen and Mr Quickie.

On 28 August 2021, Damian Lane rode Probabeel to victory in the Group 3 W W Cockram Stakes at Caulfield (1200m) beating Chassis and Instant Celebrity.

On 9 October 2021 Probabeel, ridden by Brett Prebble, won the Caulfield Stakes over 2000m at Caulfield from Nonconformist and Zaaki.

Probabeel was placed 5th in the 2021 Cox Plate behind State Of Rest, Anamoe and Verry Elleegant and Mo'unga.

Probabeel was named New Zealand Horse of the Year in 2020-21 with 29 votes ahead of Avantage (14), Melody Belle (10), Aegon (3) and Amarelinha (1).

On 12 February 2022 Probabeel returned to racing for the first time since the Cox Plate and repeated her win in the Group 3 Geoffrey Bellmaine Stakes (1200m) at Caulfield in the hands of Brett Prebble.  Unlike her easy victory in the previous year's event, she bravely reached the lead in the final stride to win by a nose over Flying Mascot and Mariamia. 

After the race it was revealed she had suffered a career ending suspensory ligament injury and was retired from racing to Cambridge Stud as a broodmare.

Stud career
In Probabeel's first season as a broodmare she was serviced by the stallion Almanzor.

Pedigree

References 

New Zealand racehorses
Racehorses bred in New Zealand
Racehorses trained in New Zealand
2016 racehorse births
Thoroughbred family 7-d